Miletus was an Ancient Greek city in Ionia.

Miletus can also refer to:
 Miletus (Crete), a town of ancient Crete, Greece
 Miletus (Mysia), a town of ancient Mysia, now in Turkey
 Miletus (Paphlagonia), a town of ancient Paphlagonia, now in Turkey
 Metropolis of Miletus, defunct diocese of the Church of Constantinople
 Miletus (mythology), mythical founder of the city
 Miletus, West Virginia, an unincorporated community
 Miletus (butterfly), a genus of butterflies
 Vitus Miletus (1549–1615), German Roman Catholic theologian

See also
 List of ancient Milesians, many of them identified as "of Miletus"
 Meletius of Antioch (before 357 - 381), bishop
 Meletus (fl. 4th-3rd century BC), prosecutor in the trial of Socrates